The 2022 Orlando USTA Pro Circuit Event 2 was a professional tennis tournament played on outdoor hard courts. It was the fourth edition of the tournament which was part of the 2022 ITF Women's World Tennis Tour. It took place in Orlando, Florida, United States between 23 and 29 May 2022.

Singles main draw entrants

Seeds

 1 Rankings are as of 16 May 2022.

Other entrants
The following players received wildcards into the singles main draw:
  Gabriella Price
  Erica Oosterhout

The following player received entry using a protected ranking:
  Maria Mateas

The following players received entry from the qualifying draw:
  Jenna DeFalco
  Alexa Graham
  Ashley Lahey
  Ma Yexin
  Christina Rosca
  Himeno Sakatsume
  Kennedy Shaffer
  Amy Zhu

Champions

Singles

  Robin Anderson def.  Sachia Vickery, 7–5, 6–4

Doubles

  Sophie Chang /  Angela Kulikov def.  Hanna Chang /  Elizabeth Mandlik, 6–3, 2–6, [10–6]

References

External links
 2022 Orlando USTA Pro Circuit Event 2 at ITFtennis.com

2022 ITF Women's World Tennis Tour
2022 in American tennis
May 2022 sports events in the United States